San Juan Ixcoy (also known as  in Qʼanjobʼal) is a municipality in the Guatemalan department of Huehuetenango. Its population of 19,367 (in 2002) is predominantly of Maya Q'anjob'al descent.

San Juan Ixcoy is located in the Sierra de los Cuchumatanes range and borders with the municipalities of Soloma and Santa Eulalia in the North, Chiantla in the South and Nebaj in the East. By road, San Juan Ixcoy is directly served by RN-9-N. No rail transport exists nearby, and while there is an airport in Quetzaltenango, the closest international airport is La Aurora International Airport.

Most households depend on subsistence agricultural and produce maize, beans and ayote (Cucurbita argyrosperma), as well as potatoes, wheat, and horticultural products. Artesanal production of textiles and traditional crafts adds to household income. Other economic activities include labour migration to the large plantations on the Guatemalan south coast and in some cases to the United States.

References

External links
Official site of the Municipality

Municipalities of the Huehuetenango Department